Relebactam is a chemical compound used in combination with antibiotics to improve their efficacy.  As a beta-lactamase inhibitor, it blocks the ability of bacteria to break down a beta-lactam antibiotic.  In the United States, relebactam is approved for use in the combination imipenem/cilastatin/relebactam (Recarbrio).

See also 
 Avibactam

References 

Antibiotics
Beta-lactamase inhibitors
Nitrogen heterocycles
4-Piperidinyl compounds